The tonsillar branch of the facial artery ascends between the pterygoideus internus and styloglossus muscles, and then along the side of the pharynx, perforating the constrictor pharyngis superior, to ramify in the substance of the palatine tonsil and root of the tongue.

References

External links

Arteries of the head and neck